The Carroll County Accident is a studio album by country music singer Porter Wagoner. It was released in 1969 by RCA Victor (catalog no. LSP-4116).

The album debuted on Billboard magazine's Top Country Albums chart on March 1, 1969, peaked at No. 4, and remained on the chart for a total of 28 weeks. The album included the No. 2 hit, "The Carroll County Accident".

AllMusic gave the album a rating of three stars.

Track listing
Side A
 "The World Needs a Washin'"
 "Banks of the Ohio"
 "Sing Me Back Home"
 "Barefoot Nellie"
 "Sorrow Overtakes the Wine"
 "Black Jack's Bar"

Side B
 "The Carroll County Accident"
 "Rocky Top"
 "Your Mother's Eyes"
 "King of the Cannon County Hills"
 "I Lived So Fast and Hard"
 "Fallen Leaves"

References

1969 albums
Porter Wagoner albums
RCA Victor albums